Mengyuan railway station is a railway station of Longhai railway located in Huayin, Weinan, Shaanxi, China.

History
The station was opened in 1960 as part of the rerouting of the Longhai railway for the construction of the Sanmenxia Dam. It was originally called Mengyuan but was renamed Huashan in April 1997. It returned to its original name on 20 July 2021. The former Huashan West station has been renamed Huashan.

References

Railway stations in Shaanxi
Stations on the Longhai Railway
Railway stations in China opened in 1934